Anogeissus latifolia is a species of small to medium-sized tree native to the India, Nepal, Myanmar, and Sri Lanka. Its common names are axlewood (English), bakli, baajhi, dhau, dhawa, dhawra, or dhaora (Hindi), takhian-nu (Thai), and raam (Vietnamese).

It is one of the most useful trees in India. Its leaves contain large amounts of gallotannins, and are used in India for tanning and firewood. The tree is the source of Indian gum, also known as ghatti gum, which is used for calico printing among other uses. The leaves are also fed on by the Antheraea paphia moth which produces the tassar silk (Tussah), a form of wild silk of commercial importance.

Footnotes

References
 "Anogeissus latifolia", AgroForestry Tree Database. Accessed April 20, 2008. 

latifolia
Flora of the Indian subcontinent
Plants described in 1869